Alpha Omega (sometimes ), is a professional Jewish dental fraternity. It was founded in Baltimore, Maryland in 1907 by a group of dental students originally to fight discrimination in dental schools. The headquarters is currently located in Clarksville, TN.

Objectives
The objectives of the fraternity are to promote the profession of Dentistry; to establish, foster and develop high standards of scholarship, leadership and character; to inculcate a spirit of fellowship amongst all its members; to create and bind together a body of professional people, who, by scholarly attainments, faithful service and the maintenance of ethical ideals and principles, have achieved distinction; to honor achievement in others; to strive for breadth of vision, unity in action and accomplishment of ideals; to commend all worthy deeds, and if fraternal welfare demands, to call and counsel with its members; to accept, sponsor and develop the cultural and traditional achievements of our faith; to build within our fraternity a triangle, the base of which is Judaism, the supporting sides, professionalism and fraternalism.

Achievements
In 1953, the fraternity founded The Hebrew University-Hadassah School of Dental Medicine in Jerusalem. The fraternity also founded The Tel Aviv University School of Dental Medicine, now called the Goldschleger School of Dental Medicine, in Tel Aviv, Israel.  It continues to raise funds through campaigns and grants from its various foundations to provide continual support for both schools.

History
 1907: At the Pennsylvania College of Dental Surgery in Philadelphia, a group of students joined to create an organization called Ramach, the predecessor to Alpha Omega
 1907: A similar group with similar objectives known as Alpha Omega was organized in Baltimore. These two groups joined as the Alpha Omega Fraternity in 1907
 1912: First Alpha Omega Fraternity Convention was held in New York with 40 men in attendance
 1916: Constitution and bylaws were adopted
 1916: First alumni chapter was established in Philadelphia - prior to that Alpha Omega was made up of student chapters
 1917: First issue of the Alpha Omegan was published
 1921: Pi Student Chapter was formed in Toronto thereby expanding Alpha Omega into an international scope
 1924: First non-US alumni chapter was founded in Toronto
 1932: (October 7), merger with Alpha Zeta Gamma completed with chartering of Alpha Kappa and Alpha Lambda.
 1936: Alpha Omega establishes the Achievement Medal. Given to an individual outstanding in Dentistry or its allied sciences, in recognition of his or her professional contribution. Alpha Omega has honored many giants in the field of dentistry and medicine, which included Albert Einstein, Jonas Salk, Charles Best, Harry Sicher, D. W alter Cohen, Ronald Goldstein, Gordon Christensen and most recently R. Bruce Donoff, Dean of the Harvard School of Dental Medicine
 1941: Alpha Omega donates a mobile dental ambulance to the Royal Canadian Dental Corps
 1942: Three additional mobile dental ambulances were donated to the United States Army
 1946: Alpha Omega commitment in the creation of a dental school in Israel serves as impetus for the formation of its first chapters outside of North America
 1948: With the creation of the state of Israel Alpha Omega donated materials, including hospital and field equipment, as well as qualified teachers to help train Israeli personnel. Estimated value of the materials, service and equipment sent to Europe and Israel exceeded over $500,000
 1949: Alpha Omega Biological Laboratory at Brandeis University established - first corporate gift received by this newly established first Jewish-sponsored non-sectarian college
 1950: Headquarters relocated to New York City from Philadelphia
 1952: Founded the Hadassah, Hebrew University School of Dental Medicine (interim provisional school)
 1952: Harry Jolly of Canada becomes first non US president of Alpha Omega
 1953: Hebrew University Hadassah School of Dental Medicine, founded by Alpha Omega was formally dedicated in Jerusalem - Alpha Omega's contributions to date over $1.5 million
 1954: Israeli chapters chartered in Jerusalem, Tel Aviv and Haifa
 1963: First European chapter established in Paris
 1969: The US Alpha Omega Foundation incorporated in the state of New York as a tax-exempt, nonprofit organization
 2015:  in partnership with Henry Schein launched the Alpha Omega Henry Schein Cares Holocaust Survivors Oral Health Program

Alpha Zeta Gamma

Additional chapters were at Northwestern (Beta) in 1914(?), Illinois (Gamma), Western Reserve (Delta) in 1912, Maryland (Theta) in 1921, Harvard (Eta), Pittsburgh (Kappa) in 1922 and Tufts (Phi) in 1923. Alumni Clubs were Illinois Alumni Club, Alpha Zeta Gamma Study Club of Chicago, The Boston Alumni Club and the New York Alumni Association.

A fire at the National Office in 1925 destroyed many early records. In November 1931, an invitation was extended to Alpha Omega to send representatives to meet with the Supreme Council of Alpha Zeta Gamma. With the merger viewed favorably, Alpha Omega invited representatives of Alpha Zeta Gamma to their 1931 convention in Buffalo, New York. Terms of the merger were approved at the convention by Alpha Omega and one week later by the Supreme Council of Alpha Zeta Gamma. At the  meeting of the Chicago Dental Society, a joint banquet of Alpha Omega and Alpha Zeta Gamma showed positive sentiment on both sides.

Chapters
This is a list of the chapters for Alpha Omega, in order of founding:

Notes

See also 
 Professional fraternities and sororities
 List of dental schools in Israel
 List of Jewish fraternities and sororities
 List of dental schools in the United States
 List of defunct dental schools in the United States

References 

Professional dental fraternities and sororities in the United States
Historically Jewish fraternities in the United States
Student organizations established in 1907
Former members of Professional Fraternity Association
1907 establishments in Maryland
Jewish organizations established in 1907